Mary Mills Patrick (March 10, 1850 Canterbury, New Hampshire – February 25, 1940) was a college president and author.

Biography
Her family moved to Lyons, Iowa, (now part of Clinton) in 1865. There she studied at Lyons Collegiate Institute, where she graduated in 1869. In 1871, she became a teacher at an American school in Erzurum, Turkey. There she learned Armenian, ancient and modern.  She left in 1875 to teach at an American high school in Üsküdar, outside of Istanbul.  She became principal of the school (with Clara Hamlin) in 1883, becoming sole principal in 1889. She graduated from Iowa State University in 1890, immediately becoming head of the American College for Girls in Istanbul. The College was the old high school now chartered as a college by Massachusetts.

After two years, she spent her summers in different parts of Europe. She studied at the universities of Paris, Oxford, Heidelberg, Zurich, Leipzig, and Berlin, and received a Ph.D. at the University of Bern in 1897.

She was a member of the psychological congresses at Munich in 1896 and at Paris in 1900; and of the philosophical congresses at Paris, 1900, and at Bologne in 1911.
She retired from the College in 1924 and moved to New York City. In 1932 she moved to Palo Alto, California.

Works
 Armenian Translation of a Text-Book of Physiology, 1876
 Sextus Empiricus and Greek Skepticism, 1899 (Ph.D. dissertation)
 Sappho and the Island of Lesbos, 1912
 Under Five Sultans, 1929 (autobiography)
 The Greek Sceptics, 1929
 A Bosphorus Adventure, London, 1934 (history of Robert College)

Notes

References

External links 
 
 
 Sexto Empírico e o ceticismo grego, in Portuguese.

1850 births
1940 deaths
20th-century American women writers
University of Bern alumni
Iowa State University alumni
Heads of universities and colleges in the United States
Writers from Clinton, Iowa
People from Canterbury, New Hampshire
Women heads of universities and colleges
American expatriates in Switzerland
19th-century American educators
19th-century people from the Ottoman Empire